Protoglyptodon is an extinct genus of Glyptodont. It lived during the Late Miocene, and its fossilized remains were found in South America.

Description

This animal, like all glyptodonts, had a dorsal armor protecting a large part of the body, consisting of well-fused polygonal osteoderms. The osteoderms were quite similar to those of Palaeohoplophorus, with a medium-sized, depressed central figure,  and with wrinkled and irregular peripheral areas. Its carapace appearance was more irregular in Protoglyptodon. Its caudal tube beared osteoderms whose main figures were surrounded by a crown of perforations, but separated by peripheral areas decorated in a very irregular way.

Classification

Protoglyptodon primiformis was first described in 1885 by Florentino Ameghino, based on incomplete fossil remains coming from Late Miocene terrains of Argentina, first erroneously attributed to the Oligocene. Protoglyptodon was a member of the tribe Hoplophorini, a diverse and long-lived group of glyptodonts ; Protoglyptodon was closely related to the better known genus Palaehoplophorus.

Bibliography
F. Ameghino. 1885. Nuevos restos de mamíferos fósiles Oligocenos recogidos por el Profesor Pedro Scalabrini y pertenecientes al Museo Provincial de la ciudad del Parana [New remains of Oligocene fossil mammals collected by Professor Pedro Scalabrini and belonging to the Provincial Museum of the city of Parana]. Boletín de la Academia Nacional de Ciencias 8:1-205
A. L. Cione, M. M. Azpelicueta, M. Bond, A. A. Carlini, J. R. Casciotta, M. A. Cozzuol, M. Fuente, Z. Gasparini, F. J. Goin, J. Noriega, G. J. Scillato-Yane, L. Soibelzon, E. P. Tonni, D. Verzi, and M. G. Vucetich. 2000. Miocene vertebrates from Entre Rios province, eastern Argentina. Serie Correlacion Geologica 14:191-237

Prehistoric cingulates
Prehistoric placental genera
Miocene xenarthrans
Miocene genus first appearances
Miocene mammals of South America
Miocene genus extinctions
Neogene Argentina
Fossils of Argentina
Fossil taxa described in 1885
Taxa named by Florentino Ameghino